Little Poland may refer to:

Poland
Lesser Poland (Polish: Małopolska), a historical region of southern Poland
Lesser Poland Voivodeship (Polish: województwo małopolskie), a present-day administrative region in southern Poland

United Kingdom
Shirebrook, an informal name for the town coined by a local shopkeeper.

United States
Greenpoint, Brooklyn, New York City
Port Richmond, Philadelphia
Chicago Polonia, or the various Polish neighborhoods and communities in Chicago
Little Poland, Baltimore, an informal name for Southeast Baltimore's Polish community
Little Poland, New Britain, Connecticut, the neighborhood around Broad Street

See also 
 List of U.S. cities with large Polish-American populations